Harold R. "Tubby" Raymond (November 14, 1926 – December 8, 2017) was an American football and baseball player and coach.  He served as the head football coach at the University of Delaware from 1966 to 2001, compiling a record of  300–119–3.  Raymond was also the head baseball coach at the University of Maine from 1952 to 1953 and at Delaware from 1956 to 1964, tallying a career college baseball mark of 164–72–3.  He was inducted into the College Football Hall of Fame as a coach in 2003.

Playing career
Raymond, a native of Flint, Michigan, played quarterback and linebacker at the University of Michigan under Fritz Crisler.  He also played baseball at Michigan and was the captain of the baseball team in 1949.  He played minor league baseball in 1950 with the Clarksdale Planters and in 1951 with the Flint Arrows.

Coaching career
Raymond began his football coaching career in 1951 as an assistant at the University of Maine.  He moved to Delaware in 1954 as a backfield coach under David M. Nelson, who had also played at Michigan.  Raymond succeeded Nelson as head coach in 1966.  He retired after 36 seasons with a 300–119–3 record, three national titles (1971, 1972, 1979), 14 Lambert Cup trophies, 23 post-season bids and four consecutive victories in the Boardwalk Bowl. After classifications were formed in the early 1970s, Delaware was a Division II program until elevating to Division I-AA in 1981.  At the time of his retirement, more than half of Blue Hens' all-time victories in the 110-year-old history of their program had been tallied under Raymond tenure.  On March 5, 2002, K. C. Keeler, former Blue Hens linebacker and head football coach at Rowan University, succeeded Raymond at Delaware.

Use of "Delaware Wing T" offense

A formation similar to the Flexbone, though much older, is known as the "Delaware Wing-T" was created by longtime University of Delaware coach and NCAA Rules Committee chairman David M. Nelson, and perfected by his successor Tubby Raymond. It has become a very popular offense with high schools and small colleges. It was designed at the time to be a mix between the single wing and T-formation. It took the motion and run-strength of the single wing, and the QB-under-center from the T. In this variation, there is only one wing back, with the other back lined up next to the fullback on the opposite side from the wing back. However, the Wing Back may also line up diagonally from the Tight End. He may be used as an extra blocker or a receiver. He may come in motion for running plays.

300th win
Going into the 2001 season, Raymond needed just four wins to reach the 300 mark.  At the first game of the season, a banner hung above the stadium listing the numbers 297, 298, 299 and 300. As each win was accomplished, the respective number was crossed off.

Raymond's 300th win came during the last home game of the season on November 10 with a 10–6 victory against the Richmond Spiders. As the clock wound down in the game, the crowd began chanting "Tubby, Tubby". Raymond made a short, humble speech and was carried off the field by his team as a construction worker climbed onto a cherry-picker to cross off the final number on the poster.

The following is an excerpt from Raymond's speech to Delaware fans after his 300th victory:

"I have to apologize for paraphrasing, but I feel a little bit like Lou Gehrig.  I'm the luckiest man on the face of the earth. First, I'd like to thank the Delaware fans who have been here for so many years. I know there are things that happen that you don't like.  There are things that happen that I don't like. But the thing that's there all the time is you. You're at every football game. You're excited about being here, and you truly made Delaware football something we can all be proud of. Thank you very much."

Delaware lost its final game of the season on the road against Villanova and, that winter, Raymond announced his retirement, ending his career at an even 300 wins.

Awards and honors

In 1993, the Delaware Sports Museum and Hall of Fame inducted Raymond.  On August 29, 2002, Tubby Raymond Field was dedicated in Raymond's honor at Delaware Stadium, which was opened in 1952.

On January 12, 2018, the University of Delaware hosted a celebration of Raymond's life at the Bob Carpenter Center.  Speakers included University president Dennis Assanis, former Vice President Joe Biden (who played freshman football at Delaware), NFL MVP Rich Gannon (who played quarterback at Delaware), and Raymond's sons Chris and David.

Outside of football

Political activity
Raymond became involved in Delaware politics, and remained active even after retiring to Landenberg, Pennsylvania. Because he was well-known and liked in Delaware, his endorsement was sought out by candidates. Raymond was a staunch conservative; he described himself as "just to the right of Genghis Khan."

Despite his conservative views, Raymond long supported Democrat Jack Markell more out of loyalty than because of political views. As a boy, Markell grew up seven houses away from the Raymonds and the two remained friends. When Markell ran for state treasurer, Raymond taped radio ads supporting him. In 2007, Markell named Raymond an honorary co-chair of his 2008 gubernatorial bid. Markell became the 73rd Governor of Delaware in January 2009.

Painting
Raymond was an accomplished painter. While coaching at Delaware, he began a tradition of painting a Blue Hen player each week of the season. Even after retiring from coaching, he continued to paint each senior Blue Hen player.

Family
Harold was married to wife, Diane Raymond. Raymond had three children with his first wife Sue, who became deaf as an adult after a bout with Ménière's disease and died from a brain tumor in 1990: David (the original Phillie Phanatic), Chris and Debbie. Harold also adopted Diane's daughter, Michelle.

Head coaching record

Football

Baseball
Below is a table of Raymond's yearly records as a collegiate head baseball coach.

See also
 List of college football coaches with 200 wins
 List of college football coaches with 150 NCAA Division I FCS wins
 List of presidents of the American Football Coaches Association

References

External links
 

1926 births
2017 deaths
American football quarterbacks
American football linebackers
Clarksdale Planters players
Delaware Fightin' Blue Hens baseball coaches
Delaware Fightin' Blue Hens football coaches
Flint Arrows players
Maine Black Bears baseball coaches
Maine Black Bears football coaches
Michigan Wolverines baseball players
Michigan Wolverines football players
College Football Hall of Fame inductees
Players of American football from Flint, Michigan
Baseball players from Flint, Michigan